Khageswar Roy is an Indian politician from AITC. In May 2021, he was elected as the member of the West Bengal Legislative Assembly from Rajganj. He is also Chairman of Jalpaiguri district All India Trinamool Congress.

Career
Roy is from Rajganj, Jalpaiguri district. His father's name is Ramkamal Roy. He passed Higher Secondary Education from West Bengal Board of Secondary Education in 1972 from Belakoba High School. He contested in 2021 West Bengal Legislative Assembly election from Rajganj Vidhan Sabha and won the seat on 2 May 2021.

References

21st-century Indian politicians
People from Jalpaiguri district
Trinamool Congress politicians from West Bengal
Trinamool Congress politicians
West Bengal MLAs 2021–2026
Year of birth missing (living people)
Living people